Rodolfo Cano (born 18 June 1965) is a Guatemalan judoka. He competed in the men's middleweight event at the 1996 Summer Olympics.

References

1965 births
Living people
Guatemalan male judoka
Olympic judoka of Guatemala
Judoka at the 1996 Summer Olympics
Place of birth missing (living people)